The 2018–19 Premier League Tournament was the 31st season of first-class cricket in Sri Lanka's Premier Trophy. The tournament started on 30 November 2018 and concluded on 10 February 2019. Fourteen teams took part in Tier A of the competition, split into two groups of seven. Bloomfield Cricket and Athletic Club finished in last place in the previous tournament, and were relegated to Tier B for this season. Negombo Cricket Club replaced them for this years' competition after they won the 2017–18 Premier League Tournament Tier B title. Chilaw Marians Cricket Club were the defending champions.

In January 2019, during the round six match between Colombo Cricket Club and Saracens Sports Club, Colombo's Malinda Pushpakumara took all ten wickets in the second innings of the match. Pushpakumara became the second Sri Lankan bowler to take all ten wickets in an innings. It was also the first ten-wicket haul in an innings in first-class cricket since 2009, and the best figures since 1995.

Following the conclusion of the group stage, Chilaw Marians Cricket Club, Colombo Cricket Club, Colts Cricket Club, Nondescripts Cricket Club, Saracens Sports Club, Sinhalese Sports Club, Sri Lanka Army Sports Club and Tamil Union Cricket and Athletic Club had all progressed to the Super Eight section of the tournament. Meanwhile, Badureliya Sports Club, Burgher Recreation Club, Moors Sports Club, Negombo Cricket Club, Ragama Cricket Club and Sri Lanka Ports Authority Cricket Club were all moved to the Plate League phase, with the bottom team being relegated for the next season.

In the penultimate round of the Super Eight fixtures, Nondescripts captain Angelo Perera scored a double-century in each innings. This had only been done once before in first-class cricket, by Arthur Fagg for Kent against Essex in the 1938 County Championship in England.

Colombo Cricket Club won the tournament, after finishing top of the Super Eight table, ahead of Saracens Sports Club. In the Plate League, Sri Lanka Ports Authority Cricket Club lost their final match, against Burgher Recreation Club, therefore being relegated to Tier B.

Teams
The following teams competed:

Group A
 Chilaw Marians Cricket Club
 Moors Sports Club
 Nondescripts Cricket Club
 Ragama Cricket Club
 Sri Lanka Army Sports Club
 Sri Lanka Ports Authority Cricket Club
 Tamil Union Cricket and Athletic Club

Group B
 Badureliya Sports Club
 Burgher Recreation Club
 Colombo Cricket Club
 Colts Cricket Club
 Negombo Cricket Club
 Saracens Sports Club
 Sinhalese Sports Club

Points table

Group A

 Team qualified for the Super Eight

Group B

 Team qualified for the Super Eight

Super Eight

 Champions

Plate League

 Relegated to Tier B

Group stage

Group A

Round 1

Round 2

Round 3

Round 4

Round 5

Round 6

Round 7

Group B

Round 1

Round 2

Round 3

Round 4

Round 5

Round 6

Round 7

Plate League

Super Eight

See also
 2018–19 Premier League Tournament Tier B

References

External links
 Series home at ESPN Cricinfo

Premier League Tournament
Premier League Tournament
Premier League Tournament